Sutahata is in Ward No. 1 of Haldia municipality in Haldia subdivision of Purba Medinipur district in the state of West Bengal, India.

Geography

CD block HQ
The headquarters of the Sutahata CD block is located at Sutahata.

Police station
Sutahata police station has jurisdiction over Sutahata CD block. Sutahata police station covers an area of 125 km2 with a population of 120,000. Sutahata PS is located in village Sutahata in Ward No. 1 of Haldia municipality.

Urbanisation
79.19% of the population of Haldia subdivision live in the rural areas. Only 20.81% of the population live in the urban areas, and that is the highest proportion of urban population amongst the four subdivisions in Purba Medinipur district.

Note: The map alongside presents some of the notable locations in the subdivision. All places marked in the map are linked in the larger full screen map.

Transport
The Haldia-Tamluk-Mecheda Road passes through Sutahata.

Basulya Sutahata railway station is situated on the Panskura-Haldia line.

Healthcare
Amlat Block Primary Health Centre at Sutahata (with 10 beds) is the main medical facility in Sutahata CD block. There are primary health centres at Joynagar, PO Dorojoynagar (with 6 beds) and Begunberia, PO Golapchak (with 10 beds).

References

Villages in Purba Medinipur district